Polyglyphanodontia, also known as the Borioteiioidea, is an extinct clade of lizards from the Cretaceous that includes around a dozen genera. Polyglyphanodontians were the dominant group of lizards in North America and Asia during the Late Cretaceous. Most polyglyphanodontians are Late Cretaceous in age, though the oldest one, Kuwajimalla kagaensis, is known from the Early Cretaceous (Valanginian to Hauterivian) Kuwajima Formation (Japan). Early Cretaceous South American taxon Tijubina, and possibly also Olindalacerta, might also fall within Polyglyphanodontia or be closely allied to the group, but if so, they would be two of only three Gondwanan examples of an otherwise Laurasian clade (the third one, and the only unambiguous one, being Bicuspidon hogreli from the Kem Kem Beds of Morocco). They produced a remarkable range of forms. Chamopsiids, including Chamops, were characterized by large, blunt, crushing teeth, and were most likely omnivores. Macrocephalosaurus, from the Gobi Desert, was a specialized herbivore; it grew to roughly a meter long and had multicusped, leaf-shaped teeth like those of modern iguanas. Polyglyphanodon, from the Maastrichtian of Utah, was another herbivore, but its teeth formed a series of transverse blades, similar to those of Trilophosaurus. Peneteius had remarkable, multicusped teeth, similar to those of mammals. The polyglyphanodontids first appear in the latter part of the Early Cretaceous in North America, and became extinct during the  Cretaceous-Paleogene extinction event. Polyglyphanodontians closely resembled the teiid lizards, and purported teiid lizards from the Late Cretaceous appear to be polyglyphanodontians. The only species known to have survived the Cretaceous was Chamops, which survived until the very early Ypresian (early Eocene).

Classification
 
A large-scale phylogenetic analysis of squamates conducted by Conrad (2008) found polyglyphanodontians (called Polyglyphanodontidae by Conrad) to be closely related to teiid lizards. In the strict consensus tree recovered in the analysis, polyglyphanodontids were part of a polytomy (unresolved evolutionary relationship) with teiids, gymnophthalmids, Chamops and lacertids; in the Adams consensus tree polyglyphanodontids were the sister group to teiids. (Some other studies that recognize a close relationship between polyglyphanodontians and teiids use the name Borioteiioidea rather than Polyglyphanodontia, although Borioteiioidea  encompasses only North American polyglyphanodontians.) Conrad's analysis also recovered Sineoamphisbaena, a Cretaceous lizard that resembles legless amphisbaenian lizards, as a member of Polyglyphanodontidae. On the other hand, a later large-scale phylogenetic analysis of fossil and living squamates published in 2012 by Gauthier et al. found that Polyglyphanodontia was not particularly closely related to teiids, but rather that it was the sister taxon of the clade containing the extinct marine mosasaurs, their closest relatives and the major lizard group Scleroglossa. Because the first scleroglossans appear in the Late Jurassic, polyglyphanodontians must also have originated in the Late Jurassic if this phylogeny is correct. However, polyglyphanodontians are limited to the Cretaceous, meaning that a long ghost lineage may exist. The primary analysis of Gauthier et al. (2012) did not find polyglyphanodontians and Sineoamphisbaena to be closely related; however, the authors noted that when all snake-like squamates and mosasaurs were removed from the analysis, and burrowing squamates were then added individually to it, Sineoamphisbaena grouped with polyglyphanodontians. Gauthier et al. (2012) considered it possible that Sineoamphisbaena was a burrowing polyglyphanodontian, though, agreeing with. Subsequent analyses based on  have also supported Sineoamphisbaenia as a polyglyphanodontian (the combined molecular and morphological analysis of Müller et al.; in the morphology only analyses carried out by Wiens et al. but not their combined molecular and morphological analyses; and in morphology only analyses carried out by  who were describing new polyglyphanodontians from Asia [Funuisaurus and Tianyusaurus]).

A phylogenetic analysis conducted by Reeder et al. (2015) based on combined molecular and morphological data (based on ) recovered Polyglyphanodontia as members of Toxicofera; specifically, it was recovered as the sister group of Iguania. Lee (2009) analyzed a combined molecular and morphological data set (based on earlier studies by Lee) and also had found polyglyphanodontians as the sister to iguanians but Lee's finding was not acknowledged by. Combined molecular and morphological data analyses using Conrad's data  consistently found polyglyphanodontians as the sisters to teiioids.

References

Scincogekkonomorpha
Cretaceous reptiles of Asia
Cretaceous reptiles of North America
Fossil taxa described in 2000
Early Cretaceous first appearances
Late Cretaceous extinctions